Thomas Pashley was an English professional footballer who played as a goalkeeper.

Career
Pashley joined Bradford City from Whitby Town in February 1905. He made one league appearance for the club, before being released later in 1905.

Sources

References

Date of birth missing
Date of death missing
English footballers
Whitby Town F.C. players
Bradford City A.F.C. players
English Football League players
Association football goalkeepers